Hoek, corner in Dutch and Afrikaans, may refer to:

 the name of several villages in the Netherlands
 Hook of Holland (Hoek van Holland), near Rotterdam
 Hoek, Zeeland, near Terneuzen

Hoek, Gelderland

 People
 Hoek (surname), Dutch surname
 Van den Hoek (disambiguation), Dutch surname
Other
Hoek Glacier, Antarctic glacier